MV Dagalien is a roll-on/roll-off passenger and car ferry that operates on the Yell service, operated by SIC Ferries. She is the sister ship of MV Daggri.

History
The Dagalien was bought in 2003 along with MV Daggri.

In 2003 the ferry, which had been until now known only as B600/2, was named Dagalien and launched.

Layout
The vessel has a large car deck and an entrance to the passenger lounge.

The passenger lounge is known as the 'Passenger Saloon'.

There is a passenger saloon with seats, tables, toilets, vending machines and a children's play area. There are two entrances to the passenger saloon.

Service
Along with its sister ship, MV Daggri, they operate between the ports of Toft (on the Shetland Mainland) and Ulsta (on the Island of Yell).
The Ro-Ro ferries are owned and operated by Shetland Islands Council.

http://www.shetland.gov.uk/ferries/

References

2003 ships
Transport in Shetland